The 1999 U.S. Men's Clay Court Championships was an Association of Tennis Professionals tennis tournament held in Orlando, Florida in the United States. It was the 31st edition of the tournament and was held from April 19 to April 26. Magnus Norman won the singles title.

Seeds
A champion seed is indicated in bold text while text in italics indicates the round in which that seed was eliminated.

Draw

References

Singles